Mass Effect 3 is an action role-playing video game developed by BioWare and published by Electronic Arts. It was released for Microsoft Windows, PlayStation 3 and Xbox 360 on March 6, 2012, and for Wii U on November 18, 2012. The game features a variety of downloadable content packs that were released from March 2012 to April 2013 on Xbox Live, PlayStation Network, and BioWare's Social Network. The Wii U version of the game does not support downloadable content but includes several packs. The content listed as promotional content was only available to the Microsoft Windows, PlayStation 3 and Xbox 360 versions of the game through limited promotional opportunities. Following the game's release on Steam, Mass Effect 3'''s DLC was collected into a single pack titled Mass Effect 3 DLC Bundle, and sold for the same price as the game itself.  In 2021, all of the Mass Effect 3 downloadable content was remastered as part of the Mass Effect Legendary Edition''.

Single-player content

General content

Promotional content

Multiplayer content

General content

Promotional content

References

External links
Mass Effect 3s official website

Mass Effect 3
Mass Effect downloadable content